Stabsfeldwebel Ferdinand Udvardy was a Hungarian conscript into the military of the Austro-Hungarian Empire who became a flying ace credited with nine aerial victories. Upon the dissolution of Austria-Hungary, Udvardy became a Hungarian citizen, and in the aftermath of World War I, defended his new nation against invasion.

Before and during World War I
Ferdinand Udvardy was born in what was then Pozsony (today Bratislava, Slovakia) in 1895. He was of Hungarian parentage. He joined military service in 1915 and posted to the 72nd Infantry Regiment of the Austro-Hungarian Army. After infantry basic training, he volunteered for aviation training, was posted to Fliegerersatzkompanie 6, and graduated a pilot with the rank of korporal on 21 September 1916. He was assigned to Fliegerkompanie 10 on 1 October 1916, flew six combat missions in their two-seater reconnaissance craft, and promptly requested duty as a fighter pilot. He trained further, as the Hansa-Brandenburg D.I fighter was tricky to fly at lesser speeds and low altitudes, and was transferred to Fliegerkompanie 42J, which was a dedicated fighter unit, in May 1917. Flik 42J had some eight aces on its rolls:
Johann Risztics,
Otto Jaeger,
Karl Teichmann,
Friedrich Hefty,
Ernst Strohschneider,
Georg Kenzian,
Franz Graeser, and
Karl Patzelt.

Udvardy stayed with Flik 42J until war's end. The unit's equipment evolved to include Aviatik D.I and Phonix D.I fighters, but Albatros D.IIIs came to predominate. While with the unit, Udvardy won eight aerial victories, and was awarded the Gold Bravery Medal twice and the Silver Bravery Medal First Class thrice. He was wounded once, in the knee on 27 October 1917, and took three months recuperation before he could fly again. He would become close friends, both on the ground and in the air, with two other noncommissioned officers in the squadron; after Hefty and Risztics won their own Gold Bravery Medals, the trio became known as "The Golden Triumvirate". Udvardy would soldier on through being shot down without injury on 27 October 1918. He ended his war promoted to Stabsfeldwebel.

Post World War I
When Austria-Hungary dissolved, Udvardy became a Hungarian citizen. He served in the 8th Squadron of the Red Air Corps, along with Risztics, Hefty, Alexander Kasza, and Stefan Fejes, when Hungary battled invaders in 1919. Udvardy won his last aerial victory against the Romanians at this time.

Udvardy is believed to have survived the Second World War, but died soon thereafter.

List of aerial victories

See also
Aerial victory standards of World War I

Endnotes

Sources

1895 births
Year of death uncertain
Hungarian air force personnel
Military personnel from Bratislava
1945 deaths
Austro-Hungarian World War I flying aces